Licht is a cycle of seven operas composed by Karlheinz Stockhausen between 1977 and 2003.

Licht may also refer to:

Entertainment and Film
 Licht (Black Clover), a character in the manga series Black Clover
 Licht ins Dunkel, an annual telethon held in Austria since 1973.
 When the Light Comes or Licht, a 1998 adventure drama film by Stijn Coninx

Music
 Licht, a 2003 album by the German band Faun
 Licht (Die Apokalyptischen Reiter album), 2008
 Licht (Nena album), 2020

Other uses
Licht (surname)
 Licht-Oase, a 1980s New Age cult also known as Ramtha

See also
Light (disambiguation)
Leight (surname)
Light (surname)
Lyte (surname)
Lyte (disambiguation)